Cinctura lilium, common name the banded tulip, is a species of sea snail, a marine gastropod mollusk in the family Fasciolariidae, the spindle snails, the tulip snails and their allies.

Shell description
The banded tulip shell does not grow as large as that of the true tulip, Fasciolaria tulipa. Also the color pattern is different: the color splotches appear as a redder color (blue in rare areas) and the stripes that give the banded tulip its name are much farther apart.

The shell grows to be 2 ¼ - 4 1/8 inches (5.7-10.5 cm) in length.

Distribution
This species occurs off the coast of North and South Carolina and in the Gulf of Mexico from the Florida coast to the Gulf coast of Texas, and south into Mexico; in the Caribbean Sea

Habitat
C. lilium is found on sand or muddy sand from 2 to 150 feet depth.

Feeding habits
Little is known about the banded tulip’s diet, but it is assumed that it is similar to that of the true tulip: small gastropods and bivalves.

References

External links

Fasciolariidae
Gastropods described in 1807